Macanudo is a Hispanic word.  It may refer to:

 Macanudo (album), an album by American jazz pianist Ahmad Jamal
 Macanudo (cigar), a brand of a cigar produced by the General Cigar Company in the Dominican Republic
 Macanudo (comic), an Argentine daily comic strip by the cartoonist Liniers